The Caspian tiger was a Panthera tigris tigris population native to eastern Turkey, northern Iran, Mesopotamia, the Caucasus around the Caspian Sea, Central Asia to northern Afghanistan, and the Xinjiang region in western China. Until the Middle Ages, it was also present in Ukraine and southern Russia. It inhabited sparse forests and riverine corridors in this region until the 1970s. This population was regarded as a distinct subspecies and assessed as extinct in 2003.

Results of a phylogeographic analysis evinces that the Caspian and Siberian tiger populations shared a common continuous geographic distribution until the early 19th century.

Some Caspian tigers were intermediate in size between Siberian and Bengal tigers.

It was also called Balkhash tiger, Hyrcanian tiger, Turanian tiger, and Mazandaran tiger.

Taxonomy 
Felis virgata was a scientific name used by Johann Karl Wilhelm Illiger in 1815 for the greyish tiger in the area surrounding the Caspian Sea.
Tigris septentrionalis was the scientific name proposed by Konstantin Satunin in 1904 for a skull and mounted skins of tigers that were killed in the Lankaran Lowland in the 1860s.
Felis tigris lecoqi and Felis tigris trabata were proposed by Ernst Schwarz in 1916 for tiger skins and skulls from Lop Nur and Ili River areas, respectively.

In 1929, Reginald Innes Pocock subordinated the tiger to the genus Panthera. For several decades, the Caspian tiger was considered a distinct tiger subspecies.

In 1999, the validity of several tiger subspecies was questioned. Most putative subspecies described in the 19th and 20th centuries were distinguished on basis of fur length and colouration, striping patterns and body size, hence characteristics that vary widely within populations. Morphologically, tigers from different regions vary little, and gene flow between populations in those regions is considered to have been possible during the Pleistocene. Therefore, it was proposed to recognize only two tiger subspecies as valid, namely P. t. tigris in mainland Asia, and P. t. sondaica in the Greater Sunda Islands and possibly in Sundaland.

At the start of the 21st century, genetic studies were carried out using 20 tiger bone and tissue samples from museum collections and sequencing at least one segment of five mitochondrial genes. Results revealed a low amount of variability in the mitochondrial DNA in Caspian tigers; and that Caspian and Siberian tigers were remarkably similar, indicating that the Siberian tiger is the genetically closest living relative of the Caspian tiger. Phylogeographic analysis indicates that the common ancestor of Caspian and Siberian tigers colonized Central Asia via the Gansu−Silk Road region from eastern China less than 10,000 years ago, and subsequently traversed eastward to establish the Siberian tiger population in the Russian Far East. The Caspian and Siberian tigers were likely a single contiguous population until the early 19th century, but became isolated from another due to fragmentation and loss of habitat during the Industrial Revolution.

In 2015, morphological, ecological and molecular traits of all putative tiger subspecies were analysed in a combined approach. Results support distinction of the two evolutionary groups continental and Sunda tigers. The authors proposed recognition of only two subspecies, namely P. t. tigris comprising the Bengal, Malayan, Indochinese, South Chinese, Siberian and Caspian tiger populations, and P. t. sondaica comprising the Javan, Bali and Sumatran tiger populations. Tigers in mainland Asia fall into two clades, namely a northern clade formed by the Caspian and Siberian tiger populations, and a southern clade formed by populations in remaining mainland Asia.

In 2017, the Cat Specialist Group revised felid taxonomy and now recognizes the tiger populations in continental Asia as P. t. tigris.
However, a genetic study published in 2018 supported six monophyletic clades, with the Amur and Caspian tigers being distinct from other mainland Asian populations, thus supporting the traditional concept of six living subspecies.

Characteristics

Fur 
Photographs of skins of Caspian and Siberian tigers indicate that the main background colour of the Caspian tiger's fur varied and was generally brighter and more uniform than that of the Siberian tiger. The stripes were narrower, fuller and more closely set than those of tigers from Manchuria. The colour of its stripes was a mixture of brown or cinnamon shades. Pure black patterns were invariably found only on head, neck, the middle of the back and at the tip of the tail. Angular patterns at the base of the tail were less developed than those of Far Eastern populations. The contrast between the summer and winter coats was sharp, though not to the same extent as in Far Eastern populations. The winter coat was paler, with less distinct patterns. The summer coat had a similar density and hair length to that of the Bengal tiger, though its stripes were usually narrower, longer and closer set. It had the thickest fur amongst tigers, possibly due its occurrence in the temperate parts of Asia.

Size 
Its occiput was broader than of the Bengal tiger.
It ranked among the largest extant cat species, along with the Siberian tiger. 

Some individuals attained exceptional sizes. In 1954, a tiger was killed near the Sumbar River in Kopet-Dag, whose stuffed skin was put on display in a museum in Ashgabat.
In Prishibinske, a tiger was killed in February 1899. It was said to have been "a tiger of immense proportions" and "no smaller than the common Tuzemna horse." It had rather long fur.

Skull size and shape of Caspian tigers significantly overlap with and are almost indistinguishable from other tiger specimens in mainland Asia.

Distribution and habitat 

Historical records show that the distribution of the tiger in the region of the Caspian Sea was not continuous but patchy, and associated with wetlands such as river basins, lake edges and sea shores. In the Middle Ages, it inhabited the steppes and forest steppes of Ukraine and southern Russia. In the 19th century, tigers occurred in:
 the Eastern Anatolia Region, which is considered to have been the westernmost area where tigers occurred. Records are known from the region of Mount Ararat, Şanlıurfa, Şırnak, Siirt and Hakkari Provinces in eastern Turkey; in the Hakkari Province tigers possibly occurred up to the 1990s. The only confirmed record in Iraq dates to 1887 when a tiger was shot near Mosul, which is considered to have been a migrant from southeastern Turkey. There are also claims of historical tiger presence in the area of the Tigris–Euphrates river system in Iraq and Syria.
 the extreme southeast of the Caucasus, such as in hilly and lowland forests of the Talysh Mountains, in the Lenkoran Lowlands, in the lowland forests of Prishib, from where tigers moved into the eastern plains of the Trans-Caucasus up to the Don River basin; the Armenian and Zangezur Mountains of northwestern Persia. In Iran, historical records are known only from along the southern coast of the Caspian Sea and adjacent Alborz Mountains.
 Central Asia, such as in southwestern Turkmenia along the Atrek River and its tributaries, and the Sumbar and Chandyr Rivers; in the western and southwestern parts of Kopet-Dag; in the environs of Ashkabad in the northern foothills; in Afghanistan along the upper reaches of Hari-Rud at Herat, and along the jungles in the lower reaches of the river; around Tedzhen and Murgap and along the Kushka and Kashan rivers; in the Amu Darya basin as far the Aral Sea and along the entire coast of the Aral Sea; along the Syr-Darya to the Fergana Valley as far as Tashkent and the western spur of Talas Alatau; along the Chu and Ili Rivers; all along the southern shore of Lake Balkhash and northwards into the southern Altai Mountains, and to southeastern Transbaikal or Western Siberia in the east. In China, it occurred in the Tarim, Manasi River and Lop Nur basins.

Its former distribution can be approximated by examining the distribution of ungulates in the region. Wild boar was the numerically dominant ungulate in forested habitats, along watercourses, in reed beds and in thickets of the Caspian and Aral Seas. Where watercourses penetrated deep into desert areas, suitable wild pig and tiger habitat was often linear, only a few kilometers wide at most. Red and roe deer occurred in forests around the Black Sea to the western side and around the southern side of the Caspian Sea in a narrow belt of forest cover. Roe deer occurred in forested areas south of Lake Balkash. Bactrian deer lived in the narrow belt of forest habitat on the southern border of the Aral Sea, and southward along the Syr-Darya and Amu Darya rivers.

Local extinction 

The demise of the Caspian tiger began with the Russian colonisation of Turkestan during the late 19th century.
Its extirpation was caused by several factors:
 Tigers were killed by large parties of sportsmen and military personnel who also hunted tiger prey species such as wild pigs. The wild pig range underwent a rapid decline between the middle of the 19th century and the 1930s due to overhunting, natural disasters, and diseases such as swine fever and foot-and-mouth disease, which caused large and rapid die-offs.
 The extensive reed beds of tiger habitat were increasingly converted to cropland for planting cotton and other crops that grew well in the rich silt along rivers.
 The tiger was already vulnerable due to the restricted nature of its distribution, having been confined to watercourses within the large expanses of desert environment.

Until the early 20th century, the regular Russian army was used to clear predators from forests, around settlements, and potential agricultural lands. Until World War I, about 50 tigers were killed in the forests of Amu Darya and Piandj Rivers each year. High incentives were paid for tiger skins up to 1929. Wild pigs and deer, the prey base of tigers, were decimated by deforestation and subsistence hunting by the increasing human population along the rivers, supported by growing agricultural developments. By 1910, cotton plants were estimated to occupy nearly one-fifth of Turkestan's arable land, with about one half located in the Fergana Valley.

Last sightings 
In Iraq, a tiger was killed near Mosul in 1887.

In Georgia, the last known tiger was killed in 1922 near Tbilisi, after taking domestic livestock.

In China, tigers disappeared from the Tarim River basin in Xinjiang in the 1920s. They reportedly disappeared from the Manasi River basin in the Tian Shan Range west of Ürümqi in the 1960s.

In Turkey, a pair of tigers was allegedly killed in the area of Selçuk in 1943. Several tiger skins found in the early 1970s near Uludere indicated the presence of a tiger population in eastern Turkey. Questionnaire surveys conducted in this region revealed that one to eight tigers were killed each year until the mid-1980s, and that tigers likely had survived in the region until the early 1990s. Due to lack of interest, in addition to security and safety reasons, no further field surveys were carried out in the area.

In Azerbaijan, the last known tiger was killed in 1932; however, there were alleged sightings in the Talysh Mountains in later years.

In Iran, one of the last known tigers was shot in Golestan National Park in 1953. Another individual was sighted in the Golestan area in 1958.

In Turkmenistan, the last known tiger was killed in January 1954 in the Sumbar River valley in the Kopet-Dag Range. The last record from the lower reaches of the Amu Darya river was an unconfirmed observation in 1968 near Nukus in the Aral Sea area. By the early 1970s, tigers disappeared from the river's lower reaches and the Pyzandh Valley in the Turkmen-Uzbek-Afghan border region.

The Piandj River area between Afghanistan and Tajikistan was a stronghold of the Caspian tiger until the late 1960s. The latest sighting of a tiger in the Afghan-Tajik border area dates to 1998 in the Babatag Range.

In Kazakhstan, the last Caspian tiger was recorded in 1948, in the environs of the Ili River, the last known stronghold in the region of Lake Balkhash. In May 2006, a Kazakh hunter claimed to have seen a female Caspian tiger with cubs near Lake Balkash. However, this sighting remains uncertain and unconfirmed.

Behaviour and ecology 

No information is available for home ranges of Caspian tigers. In search for prey, they possibly prowled widely and followed migratory ungulates from one pasture to another. 
Wild pigs and cervids probably formed their main prey base. In many regions of Central Asia, Bactrian deer and roe deer were important prey species, as well as Caspian red deer and goitered gazelle in Iran; Eurasian golden jackals, jungle cats, locusts, and other small mammals in the lower Amu Darya River area; saigas, wild horses and Persian onagers in the Miankaleh Peninsula; Turkmenian kulans, Mongolian wild asses, and mountain sheep in the Zhana-Darya and around the Aral Sea; and Manchurian wapiti and moose in the area of Lake Baikal. They caught fish in flooded areas and irrigation channels. In winter, they frequently attacked dogs and livestock straying away from herds. They preferred drinking water from rivers, and drank from lakes in seasons when water was less brackish.

Disease 
Two tigers in southwestern Tajikistan harbored 5–7 tapeworms (Taenia bubesei) in their small and large intestines.

Conservation 
In 1938, the first protected area Tigrovaya Balka, was established in Tajikistan. The name was given to this zapovednik after a tiger had attacked two Russian Army officers riding horseback along dried-up river channel known in Russian as balka. Tigrovaya Balka was apparently the last refuge of Caspian tigers in the Soviet Union, and is situated in the lower reaches of Vakhsh River between the Piandj and Kofarnihon Rivers near the border of Afghanistan. A tiger was seen there in 1958.
After 1947, tigers were legally protected in the Union of Soviet Socialist Republics.

In Iran, Caspian tigers had been protected since 1957, with heavy fines for shooting. In the early 1970s, biologists from the Department of Environment searched several years for Caspian tigers in the uninhabited areas of Caspian forests, but did not find any evidence of their presence.

In captivity 

A tiger from the Caucasus was housed at Berlin Zoo in the late 19th century. DNA from a tiger caught in northern Iran and housed at Moscow Zoo in the 20th century was used in the genetic test that established the Caspian tiger's close genetic relationship with the Siberian tiger.

Reintroduction project

Stimulated by recent findings that the Siberian tiger is the closest relative of the Caspian tiger, discussions started as to whether the Siberian tiger could be appropriate for reintroduction into a safe place in Central Asia, where the Caspian tiger once roamed. The Amu Darya delta was suggested as a potential site for such a project. A feasibility study was initiated to investigate if the area is suitable, and if such an initiative would receive support from relevant decision makers. A viable tiger population of about 100 animals would require at least  of large tracts of contiguous habitat, with rich prey populations. Such habitat is not currently available, and cannot be provided in the short term. The proposed region is therefore unsuitable for the reintroduction, at least at the current stage.

While the restoration of the Caspian tiger has stimulated discussions, the locations for the tiger have yet to become fully involved in the planning. But through preliminary ecological surveys it has been revealed that some small populated areas of Central Asia have preserved natural habitat suitable for tigers.

In culture 

In the Roman Empire, tigers and other large animals imported from Africa and Asia were used during gladiatorial games.
In the Taurus Mountains, stone traps were used to capture leopards and tigers.

In the Fables of Pilpay, the tiger is described as furious and avid to rule over wilderness.
The babr (tiger) features in Persian and Central Asian culture. The name "Babr Mazandaran" is sometimes given to a prominent wrestler. A Syrian mosaic in Palmyra depicts the Sassanids as tigers, possibly commemorating the victory of the Palmyrene King Odaenathus over Shapur I. The inscription on the mosaic conceals an earlier one that read: (Mrn), which is a title used by Odaenathus. It possibly celebrates Odaenathus' victory over the Persians, the archer representing Odaenathus and the tigers the Persians; Odaenathus is about to be crowned with victory by the eagle flying above him.

See also 

 Tiger populations
 Mainland Asian populations
 Bengal tiger
 Indochinese tiger
 Malayan tiger
 Siberian tiger
 South China tiger
 Sunda island populations
 Bali tiger
 Bornean tiger
 Javan tiger
 Sumatran tiger

 
 Holocene extinction

References

Further reading

External links 

Caspian tiger
Extinct mammals of Asia
Mammals of Central Asia
Fauna of Western Asia
Fauna of Iran
Mammals of the Middle East
Mammal extinctions since 1500
1958 in the environment
Taxa named by Johann Karl Wilhelm Illiger
Mammals described in 1758
Taxa named by Carl Linnaeus
Taxobox binomials not recognized by IUCN